Kui Buri National Park is a national park of Thailand in the Tenasserim Hills in Prachuap Khiri Khan Province. It was established as the 90th national park in March 1999.

Geography  
The park, with an area of 605,625 rai ~  covers parts of the Pran Buri, Sam Roi Yot, and Mueang Prachuap Khiri Khan Districts of Prachuap Khiri Khan Province.

Flora 
The forests contain dry evergreen and moist evergreen forests. Important trees are Dipterocarpus tuberculatus, Hopea odorata, Terminalia chebula, and different species of palms.

The park has more than 200,000 sandalwood trees. It is the only place in Thailand where sandalwood can be harvested for the cremation of royal family members. Nine trees were cut down for the cremation of King Bhumibol Adulyadej. A royal brahmin spent one month selecting trees meeting royal criteria: they must be dead and have been over 100 years old.

Fauna
Some animals that can be found in the park:
 Asian elephants
 Gaur
 Malayan tapir
 Wild pig
 Leopard
 Tiger
 Serow
 Gibbons
 Macaque
 Langur 
 Sambar deer
 Asiatic black bear
 Barking deer
 Fea's muntjac
 Banteng
 Lesser mouse deer

See also
List of national parks of Thailand
List of Protected Areas Regional Offices of Thailand

References 

National parks of Thailand
Geography of Prachuap Khiri Khan province
Tourist attractions in Prachuap Khiri Khan province
Protected areas established in 1999
1999 establishments in Thailand